Sussex County Council may refer to:
 East Sussex County Council, England, from 1889
 West Sussex County Council, England, from 1889
 Sussex, England, until 1889
 Sussex County, Delaware#Government, USA

See also

Suffolk County Council, England
Surrey County Council, England